Aspach-le-Haut (Alsatian: Ìweràschbàch) is a former commune in the Haut-Rhin department in north-eastern France. On 1 January 2016, it was merged into the new commune Aspach-Michelbach.

Sights and monuments
 Saint-Barthélémy church
 Farm from 1778
 Calvary from 1858
 Railway heritage and tourism
 Château d'Aspach-le-Haut - 14th-century castle now destroyed.

See also
 Communes of the Haut-Rhin department

References

Former communes of Haut-Rhin